This is a list of Portuguese television related events from 2011.

Events
1 January - The first series of Secret Story is won by António Queirós.
22 January - Jorge Roque wins the fourth and final series of Operação triunfo, becoming the show's first and only man to be crowned as winner.
24 April - 23-year-old beatboxer Filipe Santos wins the first series of Portugal Tem Talento.

Debuts

29 October - A Voz de Portugal (2011–present)

Television shows

2010s
Secret Story (2010–present)

Ending this year

Operação triunfo (2003-2011)

Births

Deaths